The Division Two League is the second tier football league in Ghana. It is two tiers below the Ghana Premier League. The top teams after series of games are promoted to the upper tier and lower teams are relegated

League structure
The league is divided into regional zones with a zone in each of the ten regions of the country. Each zone is further divided into two groups to further reduce the distance between the participating teams in a zone.

2011–12 teams

 Brong Ahafo Football Association.

Zone A
 Berekum Berlin FC
 Mim Freedom Fighters
 Techiman Kenten AC Milan

Zone B
  Japeikrom Asuo PRU
  Nsoatreman FC (Nsoatre)
  Techiman GSP United

 Central Regional Football Association.

 Abreshia United
 Adansi Praso WAECO FC
 Agona Swedru Amanpong FC
 Cape Coast Nadel Ahli Rovers
 Ekotsi Hi-Kings FC (also listed as Gomoa Assin Hi-Kings)
 F.C. Takoradi

 Eastern Regional Football Association.

 Akosombo Sparks FC
 Amasaman Bright Future FC
 Dawu Sporting Club
 Kwahu Abetifi Odwen Anomah FC
 Real Sportive (Tema)

 Greater Accra Regional Football Association.

 Easy Classics
 Great Stars
 Power F.C. (Koforidua)
 Royal Knights (Nsawam)
 Shelter Force

References 

Football in Ghana